Khamakha Hyderabadi (1929–2017) was an Urdu language poet from Hyderabad in the Indian state of Andhra Pradesh. He was known for his poems and was a regular at Mazahiya Mushairas. He wrote in his native Dakhni dialect, specializing in humour and satire.

Bibliography
He authored three books:
 Harf-e-Mukarrar (A Story Retold)
 Ba-Fard-e-Muhal
 Kagaz ke Tishey

References

External links
 

Urdu-language poets from India
Writers from Hyderabad, India
1929 births
2017 deaths
20th-century Indian poets